Ectoedemia suberis is a moth of the family Nepticulidae. It is found on the Iberian Peninsula, as well as in France, Corsica, Sardinia and North Africa. It has not been recorded from mainland Italy.

The wingspan is 6.4-7.2 mm. Adults are on wing from July to early October, but some specimens from Marbella were taken in June. There is one generation per year.

The larvae feed on Quercus coccifera, Quercus ilex, Quercus ilex rotundifolia and Quercus suber. They mine the leaves of their host plant. The mine consists of a narrow corridor, filled with frass, that widens into a large, oval, upper-surface blotch with frass concentrated in its basal part and along the sides.

External links
Fauna Europaea
bladmineerders.nl
A Taxonomic Revision Of The Western Palaearctic Species Of The Subgenera Zimmermannia Hering And Ectoedemia Busck s.str. (Lepidoptera, Nepticulidae), With Notes On Their Phylogeny

Nepticulidae
Moths of Europe
Moths of Africa
Moths described in 1869